Bailleul is a commune in the Somme department in Hauts-de-France in northern France.

Geography
Situated in the west of the department, 5 miles to the south of Abbeville, on the D93 road.

Population

Notable people
Guy I de Balliol, Anglo-Norman baron in England

See also
 Communes of the Somme department
 House of Balliol
 Roussel de Bailleul

References

Communes of Somme (department)